Adam Cieśliński (born May 11, 1982, in Chełmno) is a Polish footballer.

External links
 

1982 births
Living people
Polish footballers
Legia Warsaw II players
Legia Warsaw players
Podbeskidzie Bielsko-Biała players
KSZO Ostrowiec Świętokrzyski players
OKS Stomil Olsztyn players
ŁKS Łódź players
Olimpia Grudziądz players
Ekstraklasa players
People from Chełmno
Sportspeople from Kuyavian-Pomeranian Voivodeship
Association football forwards